Comic magazine may refer to:

 Comics anthology
 Comic Magazine, a 1986 Japanese film
 Comic Magazines, the parent company of Quality Comics
 Franco-Belgian comics magazines
 Japanese manga magazines
 A periodical containing comic strips, in the UK referred to as a comic
 In the United States, more commonly referred to as a comic book